Adenocaulon bicolor, the American trailplant, trailplant, pathfinder, or silver-green, is a flowering plant in the family Asteraceae, native to North America. It is found in southern Canada and across the northern and western United States. It is the only species of Adenocaulon native to the United States or Canada. The genus name Adenocaulon is derived from Greek, and refers to the glandular stem. The English name "Pathfinder" was given to this species, because if you walk through a patch of its leaves you will find the path you made through them, with some of the white undersides of the leaves having been exposed, by them having been twisted.  Over time, the plant will turn its leaves back with the green side up, and the white side down. 

This plant has a very thin, glandular, erect, branching stem surrounded by triangular leaves that grow only at the base. The basal leaves are triangular with densely white-hairy lower surfaces, while the upper surface is green, hence the specific epithet bicolor. The leaf edges are coarsely toothed and sometimes entire (lacking teeth). Upon the branches are tiny inflorescences of white flowers, each flower measuring only a few millimeters in width. Around each inflorescence grows a distinctive array of club-shaped fruits covered in tiny, stalked, sticky glands. The seeds are dispersed by these fruits sticking to the fur of animals, and the clothes of people, that walk through the stalks of seed heads.

American trailplant can be found in the understory of moist woods and forests, often near trails.

The plant flowers put out a slightly foul smell to charm small flies.

References

Mutisieae
Flora of North America